Camille Antoine Arnoux Solon (1877–1960) was a British muralist and ceramist of French descent.  He was born in Staffordshire, England to French parents, and emigrated to the US, where he worked with architect Julia Morgan doing painting and tile work in the private libraries and indoor pools of William Randolph Hearst's mansions and estates at San Simeon, California.

Early life
Camille A. Solon was one of nine children born to Marie Antoinette Laure Arnoux and Louis Marc Solon. He was born on 27 March 1877 in Stoke-on-Trent, the centre of England's pottery industry.

His mother was the daughter of Léon Arnoux, art director of Mintons Limited. His father had joined the same firm in 1870 and became the preeminent master of pâte-sur-pâte technique of porcelain decoration.

In 1887, at the age of ten, Solon enrolled at Cotton College, a boarding school in a rural part of Staffordshire. He stayed there till 1892. He learned from his father and later studied at the Slade School, University College London.

Work 
In 1914 Solon immigrated to California and joined his brother Albert Solon, who was the pottery director at Arequipa Sanatorium in Fairfax, California. Arequipa was a ceramic therapy program for patients recovering from tuberculosis. Albert Solon later founded Solon and Schemmel Tile Company and Camille Solon likely worked at his brother's company early on. Albert's company, now known as Stonelight Tile, is one of only three major California tile manufacturers from the 1920s to have survived to the present.
 
From 1925-1940 Solon was a designer and art director for William Randolph Hearst at San Simeon. Solon designed the blue-and-gold Venetian glass tile mosaics used in the indoor Roman Pool at Hearst Castle. The mosaics that cover the walls, ceiling, and pool are made up of one-inch square smalti glass and fused gold tiles. The inspiration for the designs came from the 5th Century Mausoleum of Galla Placidia. Solon also designed and painted the murals in the Gothic Suite of Casa Grande's private 3rd floor. 

In the 1940s, he worked with Julia Morgan to design murals and decorative details for the Chapel of the Chimes crematorium in Oakland.  He also designed, “The Creation,” an interior mural in the Temple of Religion and Tower of Peace building at the 1939 Golden Gate International Exposition in San Francisco.

Personal life 
The Arnoux family had been well established in the European pottery and ceramic industry for over 300 years, dating back to Toulouse in the late seventeenth century. Many of Solon's siblings also became respected artisans in their own right.

In 1920, Solon married Sylvia Wallace, a fellow British immigrant.

As he aged, Solon suffered from failing eyesight and used a beloved German Shepherd guide dog to aid him. Solon died in Marin County on 8 January 1960 and was buried at Mount Olivet Catholic Cemetery in San Rafael.

References 

1877 births
1960 deaths
Alumni of the Slade School of Fine Art
British people of French descent
People from Stoke-on-Trent
Camille
British emigrants to the United States